Haren (Dutch and French, sometimes written Haeren in French) is an old municipality of Brussels in Belgium, that was merged into the municipality of the City of Brussels in 1921. It is an outlying part of the municipality of the city and is situated at the north-eastern edge of the Brussels Capital Region. In contrast to most of Brussels, Haren has maintained nearly as many Dutch-speakers as French-speakers and has preserved a somewhat rural appearance.

Pronunciation
 Dutch: 
 French

Sites
Haren has three railway stations, Buda (formerly called Haren-Buda) on line 25 between Brussels and Antwerp, Haren (formerly called Haren-Linde) on line 26 between Halle and Vilvoorde, and Haren Zuid/Sud on the line 36 Brussels–Leuven. The marshalling yard of the National Railway Company of Belgium, sometimes referred to as "Schaarbeek Vorming", is largely located on the territory of Haren municipality.

Haren's postal code is 1130.

Haren is host to the headquarters of NATO, EUROCONTROL, as well as those of many large international companies.

The first Brussels airport was also located in Haren, between 1914 and the early 1950s. The site, which was later used by the Belgian Air Force, serves since 2018 as the new NATO HQ, previously located 20 kilometers South. The current Brussels Airport site is located several kilometres to the east.

Between 1932 and 1997 Haren was the location of a Renault automobile factory, which in 1969, for the first time, produced more than 100,000 cars in a single year.  At that time it was concentrating on the assembly of Renault 4 and Renault 6 models, mostly for sale in Benelux, Germany and Scandinavia. Renault also assembled AMC's Rambler automobiles there for sale in European markets.

Haren Prison opened in 2022; it is a prison village occupying a  site, with a designed capacity of 1,190 persons.  It was partly built on the site of the derelict Wanson factory, and partly on a nature reserve.

Gallery

References

External links
 Belgium railway details

1921 disestablishments in Belgium
City of Brussels
Neighbourhoods of Brussels
Former municipalities of the Brussels-Capital Region
Populated places in Belgium